Brooke McIntosh (born January 5, 2005) is a Canadian pair skater. With her skating partner, Benjamin Mimar, she is the 2022 NHK Trophy bronze medallist and 2023 Canadian national silver medallist.

McIntosh/Mimar are also the 2022 World Junior bronze medallists and 2022 Canadian national junior champions.

With her former skating partner, Brandon Toste, she represented Canada at the 2019 World Junior Championships, finishing in the top ten, and the 2020 Winter Youth Olympics, finishing fourth.

Personal life 
McIntosh was born on January 5, 2005, in Toronto, Ontario. She is the daughter of Greg McIntosh and Jill Horstead, a former competitive swimmer who competed for Canada at the 1984 Summer Olympics. McIntosh's younger sister, Summer, is also a competitive swimmer and was part of the Canadian team for the 2020 Summer Olympics.

Career

2017–18 season 
In January 2018, McIntosh/Toste won gold in the novice division at the Canadian Championships, setting a new Canadian record (120.24).

2018–19 season 
In the 2018–2019 season, McIntosh/Toste debuted in the ISU Junior Grand Prix series. They opened the season in August at the JGP Slovakia, where they finished fifth. In September, they competed at the JGP Czech Republic, finishing tenth.

In January 2019, they won silver in the junior division at the Canadian Championships. Both also competed in the singles events (in the novice division) – McIntosh finished eighth and Toste ninth.

In March 2019, they represented Canada at the World Junior Championships, finishing tenth.

2019–20 season 
Competing on the Junior Grand Prix for their second season, McIntosh/Toste placed fifth at the 2019 JGP United States in Lake Placid and sixth at the 2019 JGP Russia in Chelyabinsk.

These results qualified a place for a Canadian junior pair team at the 2020 Winter Youth Olympics in Lausanne, and they were subsequently selected to take that spot; as a result of which, they did not attend the 2020 Canadian Junior Championships, which overlapped with the Youth Olympics.  They placed fourth at the Youth Olympics in the pairs event and also placed fourth in the team competition.

Following the Youth Olympics, coach Andrew Evans announced that Toste would be retiring to focus on attending university while McIntosh would search for a new partner. A month later, Evans announced that McIntosh had formed a new partnership with Benjamin Mimar.

2020–21 season 
The COVID-19 pandemic shut down training centres in Ontario for several months, after which McIntosh and Mimar were added to a list of competitive skaters cleared to keep training through subsequent lockdowns.  

There being no international season to speak of for Canadian skaters, McIntosh/Mimar competed as seniors on the domestic level, debuting at the Ontario Sectionals to win the gold medal. At the 2021 Skate Canada Challenge, held virtually across several hub locations to minimize gatherings, they placed fourth, qualifying to the national championships.

2021–22 season 
McIntosh/Mimar did not compete internationally on the Junior Grand Prix, debuting at and winning the 2022 Skate Canada Challenge to qualify for the 2022 Canadian Junior Championships. They also won gold there, setting a new Canadian junior pairs record for total score.

Following the junior championships, McIntosh/Mimar were sent to make their international debut at the Bavarian Open, which they won by a margin of almost twenty points, in the process acquiring the minimum technical scores necessary to attend ISU championship events. They went on to finish the season at the 2022 World Junior Championships, which had originally been scheduled to be held in Sofia in the traditional early March period. However, due to the pandemic, they were moved to mid-April in Tallinn. Due to Vladimir Putin's invasion of Ukraine, the ISU banned all Russian athletes from competing, which had a significant impact on a pairs field dominated by Russia in recent years. McIntosh/Mimar placed fourth in the short program with a clean skate, 2.38 points behind third-place Americans Smirnova/Siianytsia. They were third in the free skate, despite McIntosh falling on her triple Salchow attempt and a shaky jump combination from Mimar, and won the bronze medal overall. She said, "our program was not perfect, but we're happy that we got the medal."

2022–23 season 
With the Russian ban continuing into the new season, McIntosh/Mimar made their senior international debut in a very open pairs field. In their Challenger series debut at the 2022 CS Finlandia Trophy, they won the bronze medal. Mimar noted the event as a "new experience" and assessed that "our free wasn't the best we could do, after a good short, but we are still happy with third place."

McIntosh and Mimar were invited to make their Grand Prix debut at the 2022 Skate Canada International.  McIntosh/Mimar finished fourth in their first Grand Prix appearance, setting new personal bests in the free skate and total score. At their second assignment, the 2022 NHK Trophy in Sapporo, they placed third in the short program despite a minor throw error and set a new personal best in that segment. McIntosh said it was a "lot of fun skating in front of the Japanese crowd." They were third in the free skate as well, despite McIntosh falling on a throw triple loop and seeming to hurt her shoulder. The team won the bronze medal, their first on the Grand Prix, with Mimar saying he was "very proud of my partner that she fought until then end despite a fall." McIntosh subsequently said her arm had been checked by a doctor and was fine.

Shortly after the end of the Grand Prix, McIntosh/Mimar were the silver medallists at the 2022–23 Skate Canada Challenge after a rough free skate dropped them behind the new team Pereira/Michaud. They went on to win the silver medal at the 2023 Canadian Championships. Mimar said that it was the first time he had felt "really confident on the ice" with their free skate. Despite their silver medal, they were not one of the three teams selected to compete at the 2023 Four Continents Championships, though they were named to make their World Championship debut.

Programs

With Mimar

With Toste

Competitive highlights 
GP: Grand Prix; CS: Challenger Series; JGP: Junior Grand Prix

Pair skating with Mimar

Pair skating with Toste

Single skating

References

External links 
 

 
 Brooke McIntosh & Brandon Toste on the Skate Ontario website

2005 births
Living people
Canadian female pair skaters
Figure skaters from Toronto
Figure skaters at the 2020 Winter Youth Olympics
World Junior Figure Skating Championships medalists